Scott Wheeler is an American special makeup effects artist. who is known for his work in films. He was nominated for the Academy Award for Best Makeup for Star Trek: First Contact in 1996.

References

External links

American make-up artists
Special effects people
Living people
Year of birth missing (living people)
Place of birth missing (living people)
20th-century American people